Charles Hazeltine Hammann (March 16, 1892 – June 14, 1919) was an officer in the United States Navy, an early naval aviator, and a recipient of the Medal of Honor.

Biography

Born in Baltimore, Maryland, Hammann attended Baltimore Polytechnic Institute, and joined the Naval Reserve in October 1917. He was awarded the Medal of Honor, when, as a pilot of a Macchi M.5 seaplane on August 21, 1918, off the Austro-Hungarian coast, he dived down and landed next to a downed fellow pilot, George M. Ludlow, and brought him aboard, and although his plane was not designed for the double load, brought him to safety amid constant danger of attack by Austrian planes. An enlisted pilot at the time, he was commissioned as an ensign in October 1918.

Hammann was killed while on active duty at Langley Field, Virginia, June 14, 1919.

Namesakes
Two ships have been named USS Hammann for him.

Medal of Honor citation

Rank and organization: Ensign, U.S. Naval Reserve Fleet. Born: March 16, 1892, Baltimore, Md. Appointed from: Maryland.

Citation:

For extraordinary heroism as a pilot of a seaplane on 21 August 1918, when with 3 other planes Ens. Hammann took part in a patrol and attacked a superior force of enemy land planes. In the course of the engagement which followed the plane of Ens. George M. Ludlow was shot down and fell in the water 5 miles off Pola. Ens. Hammann immediately dived down and landed on the water close alongside the disabled machine, where he took Ludlow on board. Although his machine was not designed for the double load to which it was subjected, and although there was danger of attack by Austrian planes, he made his way to Porto Corsini.

See also

List of Medal of Honor recipients
List of Medal of Honor recipients for World War I

Notes

References

Leave No Man Behind: The Saga of Combat Search and Rescue

External links

1892 births
1919 deaths
United States Naval Aviators
United States Navy Medal of Honor recipients
Military personnel from Baltimore
United States Navy officers
United States Navy personnel of World War I
World War I recipients of the Medal of Honor
Military personnel from Maryland